The Bogotá River is a major river of the Cundinamarca department of Colombia. A right tributary of the Magdalena River, the Bogotá River crosses the region from the northeast to the southwest and passing along the western limits of Bogotá. The large population and major industrial base in its watershed have resulted in extremely severe pollution problems for the river.

Etymology 
The Bogotá River is named after Muyquytá, which is derived from Chibcha and means "(Enclosure) outside of the farm fields". In historical texts, and today the upstream part of, the Bogotá River is also called Funza River.

Course 
Main tributaries of the Bogotá River are the Teusacá, Torca, Juan Amarillo, Fucha, Tunjuelo, Soacha (left) and Neusa, Río Frío, Bojacá and Subachoque Rivers (right).

The headwaters of the Bogotá River are in the municipality of Villapinzón, in the northeastern part of Cundinamarca near the limits with Boyacá. As it runs along the western border of the city, the river forms the outlet for the heavily polluted Salitre, Fucha and Tunjuelito Rivers. After passing through the municipality of Soacha, the Bogotá River plunges off the savanna at the Tequendama Falls.

Temperature 

Gallery

See also 

List of rivers of Colombia
Bogotá savanna, Tequendama – archaeological site, earliest inhabitation along the Bogotá River
Tequendama Falls

References

External links 

  Sistema Hídrico, Bogotá
  Hidrografía Río Bogotá

 
Rivers of Colombia
Geography of Bogotá
Geography of Cundinamarca Department
Rivers